The 1st New Zealand Parliament was a term of the Parliament of New Zealand. It opened on 24 May 1854, following New Zealand's first general election (held the previous year). It was dissolved on 15 September 1855 in preparation for that year's election.  37 Members of the House of Representatives (MHRs) represented 24 electorates.

Parliamentary sessions
The Parliament sat for three sessions:

New Zealand had not yet obtained responsible government (that is, the power to manage its own affairs), and so the 1st Parliament did not hold any significant power.

The 1st Parliament was held before the creation of either political parties or the office of Premier. There were, however, appointments made to the Executive Council (the formal institution upon which Cabinet is based). From 14 June 1854 to 2 August 1854, there was a four-person cabinet, New Zealand's first ministry, led by James FitzGerald, with Henry Sewell, Frederick Weld, and Thomas Bartley (a fifth member, Dillon Bell, also joined for a short time). Then, from 31 August 1854 to 2 September 1854, there was another four-person cabinet led by Thomas Forsaith, with James Macandrew, William Travers, and Jerningham Wakefield. Some historians consider FitzGerald and Forsaith to be New Zealand's first Prime Ministers, but neither held any formal leadership role and since "responsible government" had not yet been obtained, they had little real power. Henry Sewell, appointed shortly after the 2nd New Zealand Parliament opened, is more often considered to have been the first Prime Minister.

On 17 August 1854 when the newly convened House of Representatives met, Administrator of the Government (acting Governor) Robert Wynyard was proposing to prorogue the General Assembly as he had not received authority from London. Sewell wanted to continue the debate and the suspension of standing orders was moved. The minority "Wakefieldites" (followers of Edward Gibbon Wakefield) opposed the move and tried to leave so that there would not be two-thirds of members present. This led to a violent turn when Sewell was reported to have pounced on the member for Nelson James Mackay and seized him by the throat. Suspension was moved an hour later when some members of the absent majority returned. Mackay was later found guilty of gross and premeditated contempt. There were moves to find the member from Dunedin James Macandrew guilty of contempt for entering the house with his hat on, but this was withdrawn.

The 1st Parliament consisted of thirty-seven representatives representing twenty-four electorates. Two regions of the colony (the inland regions of the lower North Island and the northwest corner of the South Island) were not part of any electorate, and so were not represented.

Electoral boundaries for the 1st Parliament

Initial composition of the 1st Parliament

Changes during term
There were few changes during the term of the 1st Parliament, with only three by-elections being held. There were six resignations and one death during 1855, and those seats remained vacant for the remainder of the term.

Christchurch Country
Stuart-Wortley resigned on 18 July 1855. His seat remained vacant.

City of Auckland
Bartley resigned on 11 July 1854. He was replaced by William Brown, who was elected on 4 August 1854.

City of Wellington
Kelham resigned on 3 August 1855. His seat remained vacant.

Dunedin Country
Cutten resigned on 23 July 1855. His seat remained vacant.

Hutt
Ludlam resigned on 9 July 1855. His seat remained vacant.

Town of Nelson & Waimea
Cautley, MP for Waimea, and Travers, MP for Town of Nelson, both resigned on 26 May 1854. Travers subsequently contested the Waimea seat that Cautley had vacated, being elected on 21 June. Travers' own Nelson seat was won by Samuel Stephens on 19 June. Stephens died on 26 June 1855. His seat remained vacant.

Wairau
Weld resigned on 13 June 1855. His seat remained vacant.

Wanganui and Rangitikei
Featherston resigned on 9 August 1855. His seat remained vacant.

Notes

References
 
 
 

01